(Filipino: Liwayway ng Kalayaan) also known as Dawn of Freedom, and Shoot That Flag: The End of Corregidor is a 1943 black-and-white Japanese film directed by Yutaka Abe and Gerardo de León.

Synopsis
The opening credits start as the narrator speaks about Japan accepting the challenge of the Western powers' arms build-up after having had to stand by for years watching rapacious America and Britain tread upon the enslaved peoples of East Asia. Japan expeditionary forces are rushed to various places in the vast areas of Greater East Asia in order to drive out the Western powers. The first blow in the Philippines is death when Nippon warplanes raid Clark Air Base and Iba airfield on December 8, 1941.

The story of the Japanese victory at the Battle of Corregidor and the U.S. military's hasty retreat from the islands. The film presented the Japanese as Asian liberators who came to free the Filipinos from decades of colonial oppression. Sub-Corporal Ikejima (Heihachiro Okawa) helps a young boy named Toni (Ricardo Pasion), the younger brother of Capt. Garcia (Fernando Poe Sr.), to walk again after a car accident.

About the Film

The film was premiered in Tokyo on February 5, 1944. Originally entitled Hitō sakusen (比島作戰) or Philippine Operation , it was changed to Ano hate o ute (literally "Shoot That Flag"). For the Philippines it was decided to use Liwayway ng Kalayaan ("Dawn of Freedom").

The use of Filipino and American prisoners of war as extras in the film became a matter of controversy after the end of the war.

Cast and Staff 
Staff
 Sponsor: Ministry of Army
 Production : Kazuo Takimura
 Director: Yutaka Abe, Gerardo de Leon
 Shooting: Yoshiaki Miyajima, Hiroshi Takeuchi
 Screenplay: Yagi Ryuichiro, Oguni Hideo
 Special Technical Director: Eiji Tsuburaya, Eizo Mitani
 Music: Kunio Kasuga
 Art Director: Kitao Hideo, Kitazuo
 Editor: Toshio Goto 

Cast

Japanese soldiers
Denjirō Ōkōchi – Captain Hayami
Seizaburo Kawazu 
Ichiro Tsukida – Lt. Nanoka
 Kaizaburo Kawazu – Captain Washio 
 Fujita Shindo – Susumu
 Nakamura Satoshi – Nakamura Iku
 Masuki Jun – Senior officer Yamada
 Satoshi Komori – Senior officer Muramatsu
 Heihachiro Okawa – Sub Corporal Ikema Ikejima
 Tanaka Haruo – Lt. Sakuragi (military doctor)

Filipino soldiers and civilians
Fernando Poe Sr. – Captain Gomez
Leopoldo Salcedo – Captain Reyes
Ángel Esmeralda – Lt. Garcia
Norma Blancaflor
Rosa Aguirre
Ricardo Pasion – Toni (Tony)

US Army and officers
 Bert Leroy 
 Johnny Arville – Captain Adams 
 Frankie Gordon
 Franco Garcia – Captain Smith
 E.S. (Ted) Lockard – US Army men (opening scene) 
 Weldon Hamilton – Bataan surrender scene
 Burton C. Galde – Bataan surrender scene

Availability
Dawn of Freedom was released in DVD on January 20, 2015, by Deagostini.

References 

 https://deepblue.lib.umich.edu/bitstream/handle/2027.42/90891/Dawn%20of%20Freedom1.pdf?sequence=4&isAllowed=y - PDF.

External links 

 Article on history and analysis: http://www-personal.umich.edu/~amnornes/Dawn.pdf
 http://pinoykollektor.blogspot.com/2011/10/48-dawn-of-freedom-philippine-wwii.html

Japanese war films
Toho films
Japanese black-and-white films
1944 films
Films directed by Gerardo de León
Films directed by Yutaka Abe
Films set in the Philippines
Pacific War films
Films shot in the Philippines
1940s war films
Japanese World War II films